Balblair distillery is a Scotch whisky distillery located in Edderton, Ross-shire, Scotland.

Founded in 1790, the distillery was rebuilt in 1895 by the designer Charles C Doig to be closer to the Edderton Railway Station on the Inverness and Ross-shire Railway line. However, so good was the original water source that the rebuilt distillery chose to ignore a nearby burn in favour of the original Ault Dearg burn. To this day, the Balblair Distillery continues to use this original water source.

John Ross, the founder, ran Balblair as a thriving business and in 1824 he was joined by his son, Andrew. The distillery stayed in the Ross family until 1894 when the tenancy was taken over by Alexander Cowan. In 1948 the freehold was bought by Robert Cumming, who promptly expanded the distillery and increased production. Cumming ran the distillery until he retired in 1970 when he sold it to Hiram Walker. In 1996 Balblair Distillery was purchased by Inver House Distillers Limited, whose other distilleries include the Speyburn-Glenlivet Distillery, Knockdhu Distillery, Old Pulteney Distillery and Balmenach Distillery.

Balblair has one of the oldest archives in distilling, with the first ledger entry dated 25 January 1800.  John Ross himself penned that first entry, which read: “Sale to David Kirkcaldy at Ardmore, one gallon of whisky at £1.8.0d”.

Balblair used to release their whisky by vintage, but in April 2019 they started to release a core range of age statement whiskies. This includes but is not limited to a 12, 15, 18 and 25 year old.

Following its appearance in several scenes in the Ken Loach film "The Angels' Share", Balblair Distillery opened a visitor centre in its former malting building. As well as containing a shop, the visitor centre is the starting point for regular tours of the distillery.

See also
 Whisky
 List of whisky brands

References

External links
 Balblair Website

Distilleries in Scotland
1790 establishments in Scotland
Scottish malt whisky